Shyam Telikicherla is an architectural designer, engineer,  artist and musician from the Washington, DC area. He is currently based in Chicago, IL. Currently a member of the band Cassettes on Tape and formerly a member of the band Metropolitan.

Discography
Cassettes on Tape
 Cathedrals EP - 2012

METROPOLITAN
 Down For You is Up - 2002
 The Lines They Get Broken - 2005

Meghan Hayes
 Snow On the Waves - 2000
 Give the Guard a Break - 2005

References

Living people
Year of birth missing (living people)